John Joseph Mattera (born 1962) is a writer and American shipwreck explorer and the subject of the book Pirate Hunters by Robert Kurson. Pirate Hunters is the story of two US divers, John Chatterton and John Mattera, finding the lost pirate ship Golden Fleece of Captain Joseph Bannister in the waters off the Dominican Republic in 2008.  Mattera first became a certified diver in 1976, exploring the North Atlantic, he was an early pioneer of the shipwrecks in the waters around New York and New Jersey, performing penetration and decompression dives long before technical diving had a name. From the late 1970s on exploring some of the most famous shipwrecks of the northeast, with over sixty dives on the SS Andrea Doria.  

Mattera is a former police officer/administrator and has spent over two decades as a security consultant to a client list of the who's who of the rich and famous, becoming one of the highest paid executive protection specialist in the industry and working in over forty countries. Mattera performed primary security duty on three US and foreign Presidential campaigns. Mattera is also one of the most accredited firearms and tactics instructors in the field.  Specializing in training for high level executive and dignitary protection.

Mattera has written for Wreck Diver Magazine, African Hunting Gazette, NRA Ring of Freedom Magazine, and other adventure publications.

Bibliography

References

Living people
American male writers
American underwater divers
1962 births